Still Standing is the second studio album by American hip hop quartet Goodie Mob. It was released on April 7, 1998, through LaFace Records with distribution via Arista Records. Production was handled by Organized Noize, Mr. DJ, Craig Love, David Whild, DJ Muggs, and members CeeLo Green and T-Mo. It features guest appearances from Backbone, Chiefton, Cool Breeze, Lil' Will, Outkast and Witchdoctor.

The album peaked at number 6 on the Billboard 200 and number 2 on the Top R&B/Hip-Hop Albums chart in the United States, and was certified Gold by the Recording Industry Association of America on May 7, 1998. The single "Black Ice (Sky High)" peaked at number 50 on the Billboard Hot 100.

Track listing

Charts

Weekly charts

Year-end charts

Certifications

References

External links

1998 albums
Goodie Mob albums
LaFace Records albums
Albums produced by DJ Muggs
Albums produced by Organized Noize